General Winfield Scott Hancock (1913) is a sculpture by Cyrus E. Dallin on the east side of the Pennsylvania State Memorial in Gettysburg, Pennsylvania. Winfield Scott Hancock, a Union Army officer in the U.S. Civil War, is one of eight military figures depicted on the monument.

The bronze sculpture measures eight feet in height. It shows Hancock standing and dressed in his military regalia, holding a sword in his left hand. It was cast by Gorham Manufacturing Company of Providence, Rhode Island, installed in April 1913, and formally dedicated on July 4, 1913.

References 

Statues in Pennsylvania
Bronze sculptures in Pennsylvania
1913 establishments in Pennsylvania
Works by Cyrus Edwin Dallin
Bronze sculptures

Gettysburg Battlefield monuments and memorials
Outdoor sculptures in Pennsylvania
1913 sculptures